The Confederate Monument in Union City, Tennessee, also known as First Monument to Unknown Confederate Dead, is a simple marker erected in 1869 in a cemetery that was the burial site for the remains of 29 unidentified Confederate combatants killed in the American Civil War. Dedicated on October 21, 1869, it was one of Tennessee's first Confederate monuments. It was listed on the National Register of Historic Places in 1977.

It is asserted to be the first monument to honor unknown Confederate dead.

Union City also has a Confederate monument erected in 1909 with a dedication that reads: 
To The Confederate Soldier of Obion County
Who Was Killed In Battle
Who Was Starved In Federal Prison 
And Who Has Preserved Anglo-Saxon Civilization In The South

References

Buildings and structures in Obion County, Tennessee
Confederate States of America monuments and memorials in Tennessee
Monuments and memorials on the National Register of Historic Places in Tennessee
National Register of Historic Places in Obion County, Tennessee
Obelisks in the United States
1869 establishments in Tennessee